"Break" is the third episode of the third series of British television sitcom, Bottom. It was first broadcast on 20 January 1995.

Plot 
Richie and Eddie return home in the afternoon from the pub, having bought a last-minute 75% discounted seaside holiday to Bridlington, leaving that night at midnight, from dodgy travel agent Bob McMayday – which actually costs £4000 and is actually located in inland Doncaster (it is described in the episode as being a 25-minute drive from Bridlington, but it is actually 62 miles away from Bridlington and the drive between the two towns would take over three times that amount of time). As usual, the two make unlikely plans about getting sex on the holiday. While Eddie announces that he will be making a "mysterious phone call", Richie is overexcited and goes upstairs to try on his swimming trunks, which turn out to be an impossibly small thong, which requires Eddie's assistance (and the violent use of both a hammer and welding torch) to remove.

After the thong incident, Richie decides that they both need to spend the afternoon losing weight to improve their sex appeal, and a series of unsuccessful attempts follows. First, the boys are not fit enough to complete any of the exercises in Richie's father's Luftwaffe training book. Then, home-performed liposuction results in a painful incident involving Richie's penis and a vacuum cleaner. Richie rigs up a refrigerator attached to a pulley to serve as a weight machine, and Eddie adds some extra motivation when he notices a nude picture of BBC broadcaster Desmond Lynam taped to the bottom of the fridge, but the attempt to lift the fridge results in both boys giving themselves a hernia. Finally, a treadmill attached to motorcycle ends with Richie falling out of the window when Eddie suddenly stops the motorcycle engine to punch a Mormon at the front door. As punishment, Richie chainsaws Eddie's legs off at the knees; Eddie sews his legs back on the wrong way, forcing Richie to sever them again and re-sew them himself.

With Eddie's legs back on, it is now 5 o'clock (seven hours before the bus leaves), and Richie watches an alarm clock with hysterical pre-holiday jitters; so, when Richie suggests checking how long it takes to get to the bus station two streets away, Eddie gladly accepts the opportunity to get out of the flat, and spends the next few hours at the pub. When Richie tries the same round-trip to the bus station, completing it in twelve and a half minutes, Eddie uses the opportunity to steal the holiday money and spends another few hours drinking at the pub. He returns home and has a drunken argument with Richie, who he tries to attack but ends up falling backwards and tearing down the curtains, before passing out on the couch at 11:55. With Eddie unconscious, Richie sneakily tries again to lift the fridge and see the nude photo of Lynam; and, thanks to an answered prayer, is successful. He lies on the floor under the elevated fridge for a close look.

Suddenly, Richie's alarm clock goes off. Eddie wakes up, causing him to dislodge the handlebars which were holding the fridge in the air from the sofa, causing the fridge to fall on Richie's head, trapping him. Eddie taunts Richie for being unable to come on the holiday, and reveals a showgirl from inside the fridge whom he intends to take on the holiday instead (presumably the recipient of his "mysterious phone call" from earlier). To add insult to injury, the photo of Lynam is a forgery (Eddie in a wig), and Eddie kicks the trapped Richie in the genitals.

Cast 

Bottom (TV series)
1995 British television episodes